, born June 23, 1958, is an American-Japanese retired professional wrestler better known under the ring name . He was also billed from Uganda under the alias The Cobra, a masked wrestler persona. He worked for various Japanese and American wrestling promotions from the late 1970s to early 1990s. He is the older brother of Shunji Takano.

Early life 
Takano was born on June 23, 1958. His father was an African American Marine who belonged to the Iwakuni base, and has also become a promising boxer. However, his father returned to the United States and left his wife, a Japanese woman, and children in Japan. Takano grew up at home with his mother and brother, and he was a mixed-blooded child. He was introduced at the age of 15 to the grand sumo room of sumo wrestling, and set foot for the first time in a dojo in March 1974, but in January 1976 the place becomes out of numbering and goes out of business.

Professional wrestling career 
Takano debuted in 1977 and worked for Stampede Wrestling, winning its British Commonwealth Mid-Heavyweight Championship in September 1983. A mere two months later, he defeated Davey Boy Smith for the vacated NWA World Junior Heavyweight Championship. Still working under the ringname "The Cobra", Takano performed in the World Wrestling Federation throughout the early and mid-1980s. In December 1984, he defeated Dynamite Kid for its Junior Heavyweight Championship. The following title loss to Hiro Saito was redeemed in July 1985, the same month that he lost and then won back the NWA World Junior Heavyweight title in the same night against the very same man, Saito. In October that year, his WWF title was vacated when New Japan Pro-Wrestling separated from WWF. He would lose the tournament final to determine the inaugural IWGP Junior Heavyweight Champion against Shiro Koshinaka in June 1986. It was during 1986, he removed the mask and began wrestling as "George Takano". He went on to win the IWGP Tag Team Championship with Super Strong Machine in March 1989, before losing the titles to Riki Choshu and Takayuki Iizuka nearly four months later.

He would then join the Super World of Sports in July 1990, which had a partnership contract with WWF. During their interpromotional events throughout 1991, he would face the likes Randy Savage, Rick Martel, Tito Santana, and Legion of Doom, and scored wins against WWF superstar Bret Hart and, while teaming with his younger brother Shunji, The Rockers, Demolition, and The Samoan Swat Team. His last major career highlight would come one year later when he won the SWS Tag Team titles with his younger brother Shunji, only to lose them the very next night to The Natural Disasters of WWF fame. SWS folded in June 1992, with the Takano brothers venturing into Pro Wrestling Crusaders.

Despite quietly retiring from active competition in 2004, Takano maintains his place in professional wrestling today as he runs his own promotion, Fighting Spirit Wrestling (FSR), which is based in Hokkaidō.

Championships and accomplishments 
New Japan Pro-Wrestling
IWGP Tag Team Championship (1 time) - with Super Strong Machine
NWA World Junior Heavyweight Championship (2 times)
WWF Junior Heavyweight Championship (1 times)
Stampede Wrestling
Stampede British Commonwealth Mid-Heavyweight Championship (1 time)
Super World of Sports
SWS Tag Team Championship (1 time) - with Shunji Takano
One Night Tournament (1990)
Tokyo Sports
Effort Award (1980)
World Wrestling Federation
WWF Junior Heavyweight Championship (1 time)
Wrestling Observer Newsletter
Most Improved (1984)

References

External links 
 

1958 births
American male professional wrestlers
Japanese male professional wrestlers
Japanese people of African-American descent
Living people
Masked wrestlers
Stampede Wrestling alumni
20th-century professional wrestlers
IWGP Heavyweight Tag Team Champions
NWA World Junior Heavyweight Champions
21st-century professional wrestlers
Stampede Wrestling British Commonwealth Mid-Heavyweight Champions